The 2004 FA Summer Tournament was a minor international football competition that took place in England from 30 May to 5 June 2004. Host nation England, Japan and Iceland participated in the tournament. All matches took place at the City of Manchester Stadium, home of Manchester City.

This three-nation mini-tournament was arranged as a preparatory exercise for England just before UEFA Euro 2004 began the following week. It featured England’s squad for that tournament, which had been named two weeks before on 17 May 2004. They won the tournament on goal difference from Japan, having been held to a draw by them but defeating Iceland via a greater margin.

Venue

Results
All times listed are British Summer Time (UTC+1)

Iceland vs Japan

England vs Japan

England vs Iceland

Final standings

Goalscorers

3 Goals
  Heiðar Helguson

2 Goals
  Wayne Rooney
  Darius Vassell
  Tatsuhiko Kubo

1 Goal
  Wayne Bridge
  Frank Lampard
  Michael Owen
  Alex
  Shinji Ono

References

External links 
FA Summer Tournament results & table
FA Summer Tournament (Manchester) 2004 – Rec.Sport.Soccer Statistics Foundation

2004
2003–04 in English football
2004 in Icelandic football
2004 in Japanese football